Buried Dreams is the fourth studio album by Clock DVA, released in 1989 through Wax Trax! Records. The tracks feature audio samples from several films. The album peaked at #61 on the CMJ Radio Top 150.

Track listing

Personnel 
Adapted from the Buried Dreams liner notes.

Clock DVA
 Paul Browse – saxophone
 Dean Dennis – bass guitar
 Adi Newton – vocals, trumpet

Production and additional personnel
 Clock DVA – programming
 Marcel Duchamp – illustrations

Release history

References

External links 
 

1989 albums
Clock DVA albums
Wax Trax! Records albums